Melanie Bernstein (born 28 September 1976) is a German politician of the Christian Democratic Union (CDU) who served as a member of the Bundestag from the state of Lower Saxony from 2017 to 2021, and again since 2023.

Political career 
Bernstein became a member of the Bundestag in the 2017 German federal election, elected in the constituency of Plön – Neumünster. She was a member of the Committee on Culture and Media and the Committee on Family, Senior Citizens, Women and Youth.

Bernstein lost her seat to Kristian Klinck from the Social Democratic Party at the 2021 German federal election. In January 2023, following the death of Gero Storjohann, Bernstein moved up the list and returned to the Bundestag.

Other activities
 Deutsche Maritime Akademie, Member of the Advisory Board 
 Max Planck Institute for Evolutionary Biology, Member of the Board of Trustees

References

External links 

  
 Bundestag biography 

1976 births
Living people
Members of the Bundestag for Lower Saxony
Female members of the Bundestag
21st-century German women politicians
Members of the Bundestag 2017–2021
Members of the Bundestag 2021–2025
Members of the Bundestag for the Christian Democratic Union of Germany